The 1953 Columbia Lions football team was an American football team that represented Columbia University as an independent during the 1953 college football season. 

In their 24th season under head coach Lou Little, the Lions compiled a 4–5 record, and were outscored 153 to 124. Gene Wodeshick was the team captain.  

Columbia played its home games at Baker Field in Upper Manhattan, in New York City.

Schedule

References

Columbia
Columbia Lions football seasons
Columbia Lions football